Geoff Williams  (born 1957) is a New Zealand contemporary realist artist, based in the southern South Island city of Dunedin, Otago. He is best known for his meticulously rendered acrylic paintings, encompassing nudes, landscapes and still life. He started his career as a sign writer and screen printer in his father's sign shop where he was exposed to other pre-eminent New Zealand artists. He has been working as full-time artists since the mid-1990s.

Significant recognition was afforded Williams by pre-eminent art critic John Daly-Peoples in the National Business Review. Peoples wrote

"Geoff Williams' paintings of landscapes, still life and nudes are filled with colour and light. The surface of these works are alive with thousands of tiny brush strokes that combine to make objects which shimmer and dance. There is an impressionistic quality to the work that recalls the pointillism of Seurat and the feverish brush strokes of van Gogh. Each work appears to have an underlying life force, the small painterly gestures animating the objects and their backgrounds. The artist also renders the varying textures of the objects he paints."

External links
Geoff William's website
Profile at Fisher Galleries website
Artist Profile and Examples of Work at The Artist's Room Gallery
Profile at Saffron Gallery of Art

Notes

1957 births
Living people
Realist painters
Contemporary painters
Landscape painters
New Zealand painters